Jacob Grimstead (April 11, 1905 – November 18, 1993) was an American politician who served in the Iowa Senate from the 41st district from 1953 to 1965.

References

1905 births
1993 deaths
Republican Party Iowa state senators